German submarine U-301 was a Type VIIC U-boat built for the German Navy (Kriegsmarine) during World War II. The submarine was laid down on 12 February 1941 at the Flender Werke yard at Lübeck, launched on 25 March 1942, and commissioned on 9 May 1942. During her short career the U-boat sailed on three combat patrols, without sinking or damaging any ships, before she was sunk on 21 January 1943 by a British submarine in the Mediterranean Sea.

Design and description
German Type VIIC submarines were preceded by the shorter Type VIIB submarines. The submarine had two shafts and two  propellers. U-301 could submerge to up to  underwater.

U-301 had a maximum speed of  while surfaced and a maximum speed of  when submerged. U-301 was fitted with five  torpedo tubes (four in the bow and one in the stern), fourteen torpedoes or 26 TMA mines, one  SK C/35 naval gun with 220 rounds, and a  C/30 anti-aircraft gun. The submarine had a complement of between 44 and 60 men.

Construction and career
Ordered on 6 August 1940, U-301 was laid down on 12 February 1941 at the Flender Werke yard at Lübeck, Northern Germany. The submarine was launched on 25 March 1942, and commissioned on 9 May 1942 under the command of Oberleutnant zur See Willy-Roderich Körner.

Between 9 May 1942 and 30 September 1942, U-301 conducted training with the 5th U-boat Flotilla.

First patrol
After completing her training, U-301 was transferred to the 1st U-boat Flotilla based at Brest in France, for front-line service on 1 October 1942. On that day, U-301 departed Kiel and sailed out into the Atlantic Ocean, operating as part of wolfpack 'Panther' from 11 to 16 October, 'Puma' from 16 to 26, and 'Südwärts' from 24 to 26. U-301 attempted to attack the US-bound convoy ON 139 along with several U-boats on 23 and 24 October, but their attacks were repelled by the escorting ships. The submarine arrived in Brest on 7 November. U-301 did not sink any ship during this patrol.

Second patrol
U-301 sailed from Brest on 3 December 1942, then passed through the Strait of Gibraltar into the Mediterranean Sea and on to the U-boat base at La Spezia in northern Italy, arriving on 14 December. The patrol was also unsuccessful.

Third patrol
Transferred to the 29th U-boat Flotilla on 1 January 1943, U-301 sailed on her third and final patrol on 20 January. The next day at 8:48 in the morning, U-301 was sunk west of Bonifacio, Corsica, in position  by torpedoes from the British submarine . Three minutes later three explosions were heard, a large cloud of smoke was seen and it was noted that radio transmissions stopped. Sahib closed and recovered the only survivor from the 46 crew, 19-year-old Wilhelm Rahn.

See also
 Mediterranean U-boat Campaign (World War II)

References

Bibliography

External links
 U-boat Archive: "U 301" Interrogation of Sole Survivor 

 U-301 at ubootwaffe.net 

German Type VIIC submarines
U-boats commissioned in 1942
U-boats sunk in 1943
World War II submarines of Germany
World War II shipwrecks in the Mediterranean Sea
U-boats sunk by British submarines
1942 ships
Ships built in Lübeck
Maritime incidents in January 1943